Jablanica is a dispersed settlement in the hills west of Boštanj in the Municipality of Sevnica in central Slovenia. The area is part of the historical region of Lower Carniola. The municipality is now included in the Lower Sava Statistical Region. During World War II, the village was occupied by the Germans, who renamed it .

References

External links
Jablanica at Geopedia

Populated places in the Municipality of Sevnica